Thenmathur or EAC township is a township in Tiruvannamalai in Tiruvannamalai District in Tamil Nadu State. It serves as a suburban to its main city Tiruvannamalai. Thenmathur is 2.6 km from its Taluk Main Town Tiruvannamalai. Thenmathur is located 2.9 km from its District Main City Tiruvannamalai. It is located 158 km from its State Main City Chennai.

Nearby towns and panchayats with distance are Tiruvannamalai (2.9 km), So.Kilnachipattu (3.4 km), Chinnakangiyanur (3.8 km), Nallavanpalayam (4.3 km). Towns nearby Tiruvannamalai (2.6 km), Thandrampet (15.3 km), Thurinjapuram (19.9 km), Keelpennathur (21.8 km).

Speciality
Tamil Nadu north zone's second famous deemed Arunai Engineering College  and university is here. It is the second largest after Vit spreads over 14.5 km2 from Thenmathur to Veraiyur.

Demographics
Thenmathur has a population of over 5000 providing sub urban to Tiruvannamalai urbanity. It comes under Tiruvannamalai urban agglomerations on Tirukovilur Road (Chitoor–Cudllore road) NH 234A. There are three railway stations for Thenmathur at Tirukovilur railway route:
 Thenmathur (requesting station)
 Arunai University – l
 Arunai University – ll

References

External links

Cities and towns in Tiruvannamalai district